Notable events of 2007 in webcomics.

Events

Zuda Comics, an imprint of DC Comics, launches on October 30.
Marvel Digital Comics Unlimited, an online archive of Marvel Comics, launches on November 13.
Cloud-based comics platform ComiXology launches.

Awards
Web Cartoonist's Choice Awards, "Outstanding Comic" won by Nicholas Gurewitch's Perry Bible Fellowship.
Clickburg Webcomic Awards, won by Rob van Barneveld, Martijn van Santen, and others.
Eagle Awards, "Favourite Web-Based Comic" won by Jerry Holkins and Mike Krahulik's Penny Arcade.
Eisner Awards, "Best Digital Comic" won by Steve Purcell's Sam & Max: The Big Sleep.
Harvey Awards, "Best Online Comics Work" won by Nicholas Gurewitch's Perry Bible Fellowship.
Ignatz Awards, "Outstanding Online Comics" won by Chris Onstad's Achewood.
Joe Shuster Awards, "Outstanding WebComic Creator/Creative Team" won by Dan Kim, for April & May & June, Kanami & Penny Tribute.
The Weblog Awards, "Best Comic Strip" won by Randall Munroe's xkcd.
ENnies, "Best Regalia" won by Rich Burlew's The Order of the Stick: No Cure for the Paladin Blues.

Webcomics started

 January 1 — A.D.: New Orleans After the Deluge by Josh Neufeld
 January 4 — Create a Comic Project by John Baird 
 March 2 — Galaxion by Tara Tallan
 March 18 — Sugar Bits by Vinson Ngo
 May 14 — Octopus Pie by Meredith Gran
 June 3 — MS Paint Adventures by Andrew Hussie
 June 20 — The Abominable Charles Christopher by Karl Kerschl
 July — Masque of the Red Death by Wendy Pini
 September 7 — Eben 07 by Eben Burgoon and D.Bethel
 September 27 — The Phoenix Requiem by Sarah Ellerton
 October 29 — Grey Legacy by Wayne Wise and Fred Wheaton
 October 30 — High Moon by David Gallaher, Steve Ellis, and Scott O Brown
 December 11 — Don't Forget To Validate Your Parking by Mike Le
 December 13 — The Night Owls by Peter and Bobby Timony
 Hark! A Vagrant by Kate Beaton
 Ma vie est tout à fait fascinante by Pénélope Bagieu
 Noblesse by Son Je-ho and Lee Kwang-su
 Hori-san to Miyamura-kun by HERO
 pictures for sad children by Simone Veil
 Pink Lady by Yeon Woo and Seo Na
 Sin Titulo by Cameron Stewart
 Sugarshock! by Joss Whedon
 Subnormality by Winston Rowntree

Webcomics ended
 Art Comics Daily by Bebe Williams, 1995 – 2007
 Polymer City Chronicles (online) by Chris Morrison, 1995 – 2007
 Bruno by Christopher Baldwin, 1996 – 2007
 You Damn Kid! by Owen Dunne, 1997 – 2007
 Triangle and Robert by Patrick Shaughnessy, 1999 – 2007
 Bob and George, by David Anez, 2000 – 2007
 A Miracle of Science by Jon Kilgannon and Mark Sachs, 2002 – 2007  
 Inverloch by Sarah Ellerton, 2003 – 2007 
 Starslip Crisis by Kristofer Straub, 2005 – 2007

References

 
Webcomics by year